This is a list of waterfalls in South Africa

References

 
South Africa
Waterfalls
Waterfalls